Lady Zhang (張夫人) may refer to:

 Lady Zhang (Lü Shao's wife) (386–c. 400), wife of Lü Shao, emperor of the Sixteen Kingdoms period state Later Liang
 Lady Zhang (Zhu Quanzhong's wife) (9th-century–904), wife of Zhu Quanzhong, who later founded Later Liang Dynasty